The 1703 siege of Kehl was a military action of the War of the Spanish Succession, in which French and Spanish forces under the command of the Duc de Villars captured the fortress of the Holy Roman Empire at Kehl, opposite Strasbourg on the Rhine River.  Siege operations began on 20 February 1703, following Villars's early departure from winter quarters.  The fortress, defended by 3,500 troops of Louis William, the Margrave of Baden-Baden, capitulated on 10 March.

References

Battles of the War of the Spanish Succession
Sieges involving France
Sieges involving the Holy Roman Empire
Conflicts in 1703

Sieges of the War of the Spanish Succession
Battles in Baden-Württemberg